Desbruyeresia is a genus of sea snails, marine gastropod mollusks in the family Provannidae.

Species
Species within the genus Desbruyeresia include:

 Desbruyeresia cancellata Warén & Bouchet, 1993
 Desbruyeresia marianensis (Okutani & Fujikura, 1990)
 Desbruyeresia marisindica Okutani, Hashimoto & Sasaki, 2004
 Desbruyeresia melanioides Warén & Bouchet, 1993
 Desbruyeresia spinosa Warén & Bouchet, 1993

References

 
Provannidae